Grevillea shiressii is a species of flowering plant in the family Proteaceae and is endemic to New South Wales where it is found in only two localities near Gosford. It is an erect shrub with oblong to narrowly lance-shaped and small clusters of green to bluish-grey, later cream-coloured flowers with a brownish-maroon style.

Description
The flowers are green in the bud stage, later bluish-grey to mauve, finally cream-coloured, the style brownish maroon. This grevillea is related to G. singuliflora.

Taxonomy
Grevillea shiressii was first formally described in 1925 by William Blakely in the Proceedings of the Linnean Society of New South Wales. The specific epithet (shiressii) honours David William Campbell Shiress, Blakely's "friend and companion on many botanical excursions".

Distribution and habitat
This grevillea grows on alluvial sandy soils in forests along creek banks, under such trees as mountain blue gum (Eucalyptus deanei), turpentine (Syncarpia glomulifera) and rough-barked apple (Angophora floribunda), and alongside watergum (Tristaniopsis laurina) and river lomatia (Lomatia myricoides). It is only found growing naturally along two tributaries of the lower Hawkesbury River near Gosford north of Sydney, Mullet Creek near Wondabyne and Mooney Mooney Creek.

Ecology
Birds forage among and pollinate the flowers of G. shiressii, while ants disperse the seeds. Wasps of the genus Eurytoma prey on the seeds. Plants are killed by fire and regenerate from seed.

Conservation status
Grevillea shiressii is listed as "vulnerable" under the Australian Government Environment Protection and Biodiversity Conservation Act 1999 and the New South Wales Government Biodiversity Conservation Act 2016 (NSW). The main threats to the species include its restricted distribution, track maintenance, inappropriate fire regimes, and weed invasion.

Use in horticulture
Grevillea shiressii grows into a bushy shrub in the garden, its flowers attracting birds and providing shelter for them. Its foliage is a feature. It can be propagated readily by seed or cutting. A cultivar known as G. 'Ruby Clusters' or G. 'Splendour' is a hybrid between G. shiressii and either G. oleoides or G. speciosa, with the red flowers of these species and the foliage of the former.

References

External links

shiressii
Flora of New South Wales
Proteales of Australia
Plants described in 1925
Taxa named by William Blakely